The following lists events that happened during 2000 in the Federal Republic of Yugoslavia.

Incumbents
President: Slobodan Milošević (until October 7), Vojislav Koštunica (starting October 7)
Prime Minister: Momir Bulatović (until November 4), Zoran Žižić (starting November 4)

Events

January
 January 15 - Assassination of Željko Ražnatović, Serbian mobster and paramilitary leader.
 January 16 - Opposition parties demand the resignation of the President Slobodan Milošević.

September
 September 24 - Vojislav Koštunica wins the Presidential election, but the incumbent Slobodan Milošević refuses to recognise the result.
 September 29 – October 5: Overthrow of Slobodan Milošević

October
 October 5 - President Slobodan Milošević leaves office after widespread demonstrations throughout Serbia and the withdrawal of Russian support.
 October 6 - Vojislav Koštunica succeeds Slobodan Milošević as President.

November
November 12 – The United States recognizes the Federal Republic of Yugoslavia.

December
 December 23 - Serbian parliamentary election.

Births
24 May – Anja Crevar, swimmer

Deaths
 January 15 - Željko Ražnatović, war criminal and paramilitary leader (born 1952)
 February 7 - Pavle Bulatović, politician (born 1948)
 March 12 - Aleksandar Nikolić, basketball player (born 1918)
 May 13 - Boško Perošević, politician (born 1956)
 July 12 - Prince Tomislav of Yugoslavia (born 1928)
 August 25 - Ivan Stambolić, President of Serbia (born 1936)
 August 29 - Marko Todorović, actor (born 1929)
 December 24 - Helena Pajović, figure skater (born 1979)
 Milić od Mačve, painter (born 1934)

References

 
 
 
Yugoslavia
2000s in Yugoslavia
Years of the 20th century in Yugoslavia
Yugoslavia